The 2009–10 South Carolina Gamecocks women's basketball team will represent the University of South Carolina in the 2009–10 NCAA Division I women's basketball season. The Gamecocks will be coached by Dawn Staley. The Gamecocks are a member of the Southeastern Conference and will attempt to win the NCAA championship.

Offseason
May 4: The Gamecocks will participate in the 2009 US Virgin Islands Paradise Jam at University of Virgin Islands. The event is celebrating its tenth anniversary. Games will be played at the U.V.I. Sports and Fitness Center, a basketball facility located in Charlotte Amalie, St. Thomas.
May 15: The South Carolina women's basketball 2009 recruiting class has been ranked the fourth-best in the nation by All-Star Girls Report. The Gamecocks have added four players for the 2009–10 season, including Kelsey Bone and Ieasia Walker who were named ESPNrise.com All-Americans this week. Only Baylor, North Carolina and California signed better classes than the Gamecocks, according to the organization's rankings.
May 16: Gamecocks basketball coach Dawn Staley returned to her alma mater, the University of Virginia, to give the valedictory address 
May 17: Gamecocks signee Kelsey Bone was named one of 14 finalists for the 2009 USA Women's U19 World Championship Team
 May 22:Dawn Staley announced that Ebony Wilson (Newark, N.J./Rend Lake College/Malcom X Shabazz) has signed a National Letter of Intent to attend the University of South Carolina and play basketball for the Gamecocks. She will have three years of eligibility beginning with the 2009–10 academic year.

Preseason
2009 US Virgin Islands Paradise Jam

Regular season
The Gamecocks will participate in the Carolina's Challenge on December 20. From December 28–29, the Gamecocks will participate in the St. Joseph's Hawk Challenge.

Roster

Schedule

Player stats

Postseason

NCAA basketball tournament

Awards and honors

Team players drafted into the WNBA

See also
2009–10 NCAA Division I women's basketball season
2009 South Carolina Gamecocks football team

References

External links
Official Site

South Carolina Gamecocks women's basketball seasons
South Carolina